Benetton Group S.r.l. is a global fashion brand based in Ponzano Veneto, Italy, founded in 1965. Benetton Group has a network of about 5,000 stores worldwide. It is a wholly owned subsidiary of the Benetton family's holding company Edizione.

History 
In 1965, the Benettons opened their first store in Belluno and three years after in Paris. The company's core business consists of clothing brands United Colors of Benetton and Sisley.

Benetton was an iconic brand in the 1980s and 1990s, but has since struggled to regain this position. In 2000, it ranked 75th in Interbrand's ranking of the best global brands; however, by 2002, it had dropped out of the list.

In 2012, Benetton Group was delisted from the stock exchange and is now a fully owned subsidiary of the  Benetton family company Edizione holding.

In 2017, the group posted a loss of €180 million. Prompted by the heavy losses, Luciano Benetton, who was then 83 years old, returned from retirement as Executive Chairman for the brand.

Revival efforts also included  appointing  Jean-Charles de Castelbajac as artistic director and  re-appointing photographer Oliviero Toscani. As of 2020,  United Colors of Benetton has  1,500 employees and uses 25,000 workers through subcontractors. In March 2020, Massimo Renon was named CEO of the company.

Marketing
Benetton is known for its sports sponsorships, and for its "United Colors" advertising campaign. In 1982, Benetton hired Oliviero Toscani as creative director, which led to a change in advertising focus towards raising awareness for various issues worldwide. In 1984, Toscani photographed the first multiracial ad for the brand.

In 1989, Toscani refocused Benetton's advertising strategy under the "United Colors of Benetton" campaign. The campaign's graphic, billboard-sized ads depicted a variety of shocking subjects, including the deathbed scene of a man (AIDS activist David Kirby) dying from AIDS. Another ad featured a bloodied, unwashed newborn baby with umbilical cord still attached. The newborn ad prompted roughly 650 complaints to the British Advertising Standards Authority, which noted in its 1991 annual report that the Benetton baby ad "attracted more complaints than we have ever previously known." A third ad included a black stallion copulating with a white mare, while a fourth advert showed a light-skinned girl with blond hair hugging a dark-skinned boy whose hair was shaped into devil horns.

In 2000, Benetton was included in the reference publication Guinness World Records for the "Most Controversial Campaign."

In November 2011, Benetton created the UNHATE Foundation, launching a worldwide communication campaign described as an invitation to leaders and citizens of the world to combat the "culture of hatred." Benetton claimed the campaign was created to serve as its corporate social responsibility strategy. The UNHATE poster series uses altered images of political and religious leaders, such as then-President of the United States Barack Obama and Hugo Chávez, then President of Venezuela, kissing each other. Following Vatican protests, Benetton removed an ad purportedly showing Pope Benedict XVI kissing Ahmed Mohamed el Tayeb, the imam of Egypt's Al Azhar mosque.

Benetton won the Press Grand Prix at the 2012 Cannes Ad festival for its Unhate campaign.

In November 2017, Benetton launched a campaign in collaboration with Devbhumi, a company owned by rural women from India's remote Uttarakhand region. The initiative claimed to have empowered more than 6,000 rural women artisans in India.

In 2019, Benetton Group announced it would be hosting one of the four days of talks and presentations which makes up the 88th annual International Wool Textile Organisation (IWTO) congress.

Sport and sponsorship

Benetton Formula Ltd. was formed at the end of 1985 when the Toleman and Spirit teams were sold to the Benetton family. From , the team raced under an Italian licence, although it continued to be based, like Toleman, in Oxfordshire in England.

In 1979, Benetton first sponsored their (then amateur) local rugby team, A.S. Rugby Treviso. Benetton Rugby has since become a major force in Italian rugby, with 11 league titles and supplying many players to the national team. Benetton Group has also sponsored Treviso Basket (1982–2012) and Sisley Volley (1987–2012).

Criticisms
In 1991, Edizone Holding International, a Benetton subsidiary, bought Compañía de Tierras del Sud Argentino S. A. and became the largest private landowner in Argentina after taking over the land the company had inherited from the 19th century Conquest of the Desert. Benetton has faced criticism, particularly from Mapuche organizations, over its ownership and management of traditional Mapuche lands in Patagonia. In 1997, Benetton invested in a museum in Leleque which presented the Mapuche as migrants from Chile, which was interpreted as an attempt to diminish the Mapuche's traditional claims. The Curiñanco-Nahuelquir family was evicted from their land in 2002 following Benetton's claim to it, but the land was restored in 2007. The company published a position statement regarding the Mapuche in Patagonia in 2012. Protests and occupations began again in 2015. Activist Santiago Maldonado was last seen being evicted by the Argentine National Gendarmerie from the disputed area in August 2017. His body was found two months later.

Benetton aroused suspicion when they considered using RFID tracking chips on clothes to monitor inventory. A boycott site alleges the tracking chips "can be read from a distance and used to monitor the people wearing them." Issues of consumer privacy were raised, and the plan was shelved. Benetton's position on RFID technology is also available on their website.

PETA launched a boycott campaign against Benetton for buying wool from farmers who practiced mulesing. Benetton has since agreed to buy nonmulesed wool and has further urged the wool industry to adopt the PETA and Australian Wool Growers Association agreement to end mulesing. Benetton's position statement on the mulesing controversy is available on their website.

Building collapse at Savar

On 24 April 2013, the eight-storey Rana Plaza commercial building collapsed outside Dhaka. It housed one of the factories in which Benetton clothing was made. At least 1,130 people died. Benetton first denied reports linking production of their clothing at the factory, but clothes and documents linked to Benetton were discovered at the disaster site. Of the 29 brands identified as having sourced products from the Rana Plaza factories, only nine attended meetings held in November 2013 to agree a proposal on compensation to the victims. Several companies refused to sign including Walmart, Carrefour, Bonmarché, Mango, Auchan and Kik. The agreement was signed by Primark, Loblaw, Bonmarche and El Corte Ingles. A year after the collapse, Benetton faced international protests after failing to pay any compensation to the Rana Plaza Donors Trust Fund. Protests included shutting down Benetton's flagship Oxford Street store in London.

In April 2015, Benetton Group announced that it has doubled compensation for Rana Plaza victims recommended by independent assessors (PWC AND WRAP) and applied the principles of the Accord on Fire and Building Safety to global suppliers. Benetton's engagement for Bangladesh is available on their website.

See also

 Benetton family
 Colors (magazine)

References

External links
 

 
Advertising and marketing controversies
Italian companies established in 1965
Clothing companies established in 1965
Clothing manufacturers
Clothing retailers of Italy
Companies based in Veneto
Companies listed on the Borsa Italiana
Design companies established in 1965
Eyewear brands of Italy
Fashion accessory brands
Multinational companies headquartered in Italy
Retail companies established in 1965
Underwear brands
Watch manufacturing companies of Italy
Clothing brands of Italy